A farl is any of various quadrant-shaped flatbreads and cakes, traditionally made by cutting a round into four pieces. In Ulster, the term generally refers to soda bread (soda farls) and, less commonly, potato bread (potato farls), which are also ingredients of an Ulster fry.

It is made as farls (that is to say, flat rounds about 3/4 inch thick which are then cut into quarters). Modern commercially mass-produced potato farls, however, are often rectangular in form.

In Scotland today, the word is used less than in Ulster, but a farl can be a quarter piece of a large flat scone, bannock, or oatcake. It may also be used for shortbread when baked in this particular shape.

Etymology
Farl is a shorter form of fardel, the word once used in some parts of Lowland Scotland for "a three-cornered cake, usually oatcake, generally the fourth part of a round". In earlier Scots  meant a fourth or quarter.

Dish
A farl is made by spreading the dough on a girdle or frying pan in a rough circular shape. The circle is then cut into four equal pieces and cooked. Once one side is done the dough is flipped to cook the other side.

See also

 List of breads
 List of British breads
 List of Irish dishes
 List of quick breads

References

External links
History of Irish Soda Bread and recipes at European Cuisines.com

Irish breads
Scottish breads
Cuisine of Northern Ireland
British breads
Quick breads